Kjartan Fløgstad (born 7 June 1944) is a Norwegian author. Fløgstad was born in the industrial city of Sauda in Ryfylke, Rogaland. He studied literature and linguistics at the University of Bergen. Subsequently, he worked for a period as an industrial worker and as a sailor before he debuted as a poet with his collection of poems titled Valfart (Pilgrimage) in 1968. He received the Nordic Council's Literature Prize for his 1977 novel Dalen Portland (Dollar Road). Other major works include Fyr og flamme (Fire and Flame), Kron og mynt, Grand Manila and Grense Jakobselv.

Literary work 

Fløgstad initial prose work, Den hemmelege jubel (The Secret Exultation), was published in 1970. In 1972 he published the short story collection Fangliner (Ropes), where he encourages seaman and shift workers in heavy industry to make themselves heard in their own language, and the author's Marxist viewpoint became apparent. In the 1970s he also wrote two crime novels using the two pseudonyms K. Villun and K. Villum. His major breakthrough came in 1977 with the novel Dalen Portland (Dollar Road); which was awarded the Nordic Council's Literature Prize. Following this, Fyr og flamme (Fire and Flame) in 1980 and Det 7. klima (The Seventh Climate) in 1986 were his next most recognized works. In the major novels he demonstrates a command of realistic precision combined with an understanding of sociology. Fløgstad's work depicts the economic and social transitions as Norway moves from an agricultural culture to an industrial society, and then to a post-industrial society.

Fløgstad's style of writing, as demonstrated in both fiction and non-fiction, is very characteristic; many puns, allusions to other texts and to films and a mix of sociolects. He is one of the best-known authors associated with magic realism in Norway, and his overall realistic plots often feature many fantastic twists.

Bibliography 
 Valfart (Pilgrimage) - collection of poetry (1968)
 Sememoniar (Ceremonies) - collection of poetry (1969)
 Den hemmelege jubel (The Secret Exultation) - Prose (1970)
 Fangliner (Ropes) - Short Stories (1972)
 Dikt i utval av Pablo Neruda (Translation of a selection of poetry by Pablo Neruda) - translated poetry (1973)
 Litteratur i revolusjonen. Dikt frå Cuba (Literature in the Revolution. Poetry from Cuba) - translated poetry (1973)
 Rasmus (Rasmus) - novel (1974)
 Døden ikke heller (Death without end) - Crime Novel (1975) - under the pseudonym K. Villum
 Ein for alle (One for all) - Crime Novel (1976) - under the pseudonym K. Villun
 Dalen Portland (Dollar Road) - novel (1977)
 Fyr og flamme (Fire and flame) - novel (1980)
 Loven vest for Pecos (The Law West of Pecos) - essays (1981)
 U 3 - novel (1983)
 Ordlyden (The Wording) - essays (1983)
 Det 7. klima (The Seventh Climate) - novel (1986)
 Tyrannosaurus Text (Tyrannosaurus Text) - essays (1988)
 Portrett av eit magisk liv. Poeten Claes Gill (Portrait of a Magic Life: The Poet Claes Gill) - biography (1988)
 Arbeidets lys. Tungindustrien in Sauda through 75 år (Heavy Industry in Sauda through 75 years) - (1990)
 Kniven på strupen - novel (1991)
 Fimbul (Fimbul) - novel (1994)
 Dikt og spelmannsmusikk 1968-1993 (Poetry and Fiddlers' Music) - (1993)
 Pampa Union. Latinamerikanske reiser (Pampa union. Latin American Journeys) - Travelography (1994)
 Ved Roma port - pamphlet (1994)
 Antipoder (Antipodes) - essays (1996)
 Kron og mynt (Heads or Tails) - novel 1998)
 Dei ytterste ting. Nødvendighetsartiklar (The Ultimate Questions) - essays (1998)
 Eld og vatn. Nordmenn i Sør-Amerika (Fire and Water. Norwegians in South America) - Prose (1999)
 Evig varer lengst (Where have all the lovers gone?) - Play (2000)
 Sudamericana (South America) - Travelography (2000)
 Osloprosessen (The Oslo Process) - (2000)
 Sudamericana. Latinamerikanske reiser (South America. Latin America travels) - Travelography (2000)
 Shanghai Ekspress (Shanghai Express) - Travelography (2001)
 Paradis på jord ( Paradise on Earth) - novel (2002)
 Hotell Tropical (Tropical Hotel) - Travelography (2003)
 Pablo Neruda: Kapteinens vers (Pablo Neruda: Captain's Verse) - translated Poetry (2003)
 Brennbart (Combustibles) - Prose (2004)
 Snøhetta: hus som vil meg hysa - Non-fiction on the Norwegian architects (2004)
 Grand Manila - novel (2006)
 Pyramiden, portrett av ein forlaten utopi - essays (2007)
 Gi lyd. Tekstar 1968-2008. Selected works by Agnes Ravatn and Trygve Åslund (2008)
 Nordaustpassasjen (Northward) - (2012)
 Due og drone ["pigeon and drone"] (2019)
 Habeas Corpus - novel (2022)

Prizes 
 Aschehougprisen 1975
 The Nordic Council's Literature Prize 1978, for Dalen Portland
 The Norwegian Critics Prize for Literature 1980, for Fyr and flamme
 Melsom Prize 1981
 Nynorsk Literature Prize 1983, for U3
 Stavanger Aftenblads kulturpris
 Nynorsk (new Norwegian) litteraturpris 1986, for Det 7. klima
 Gyldendals legacy 1991
 Doblougprisen 1997
 Brage Prize 1998, for Kron and mynt
 Gyldendalprisen 1998
 Edvardprisen 2003
 Bernardo O'Higgins-ordenen, awarded by Chile's government in 2004
 The honorary Brage Prize, an open special award
 Nynorsk User of the Year, 2005

External links 
 Kjartan Fløgstad
 Council of Europe Cultural Article 
 Project Runeberg on Kjartan Fløgstad
 El realismo artico de Kjartan Fløgstad

References

 Translated from the Norwegian language Wikipedia at Kjartan Fløgstad.

1944 births
Living people
20th-century Norwegian novelists
21st-century Norwegian novelists
University of Bergen alumni
Nordic Council Literature Prize winners
Norwegian Critics Prize for Literature winners
Dobloug Prize winners
Nynorsk-language writers
Translators of Pablo Neruda
People from Sauda